Digama burmana is a moth of the family Erebidae. It is found in Myanmar.

References

External links
 Species info

Aganainae
Moths described in 1892